Concord is a village in Morgan County, Illinois, United States. The population was 176 at the 2000 census. It is part of the Jacksonville Micropolitan Statistical Area.

Geography

Demographics

As of the census of 2000, there were 176 people, 69 households, and 52 families residing in the village. The racial makeup of the village was 98.30% White, 1.14% Native American, and 0.57% from two or more races.

There were 69 households, out of which 40.6% had children under the age of 18 living with them, 66.7% were married couples living together, 2.9% had a female householder with no husband present, and 23.2% were non-families. 20.3% of all households were made up of individuals, and 11.6% had someone living alone who was 65 years of age or older. The average household size was 2.55 and the average family size was 2.94.

In the village, the population was spread out, with 25.6% under the age of 18, 6.3% from 18 to 24, 25.6% from 25 to 44, 29.0% from 45 to 64, and 13.6% who were 65 years of age or older. The median age was 41 years. For every 100 females, there were 122.8 males. For every 100 females age 18 and over, there were 111.3 males.

The median income for a household in the village was $30,000, and the median income for a family was $32,250. Males had a median income of $29,750 versus $22,083 for females. The per capita income for the village was $13,212. About 7.0% of families and 18.6% of the population were below the poverty line, including 33.3% of those under the age of eighteen and 8.6% of those 65 or over.

References

Villages in Morgan County, Illinois
Villages in Illinois
Jacksonville, Illinois micropolitan area